Malcher is a surname. Notable people with the surname include:

Adam Malcher (born 1986), Polish handball player
George Malcher (1914–2001), Polish historian, writer, and political analyst
Günter Malcher (born 1934), German athlete

See also
Walcher (disambiguation)